Leo Argyros may refer to:

 Leo Argyros (9th century), Byzantine general
 Leo Argyros (10th century), Byzantine general